David Tolbert currently serves as the third president of the International Center for Transitional Justice, a global human rights organization with headquarters in New York.

Previously, Tolbert worked with the United Nations for almost 15 years, acting as a senior legal advisor, deputy chief prosecutor and assistant secretary-general. He was the chief of the General Legal Division of the United Nations Relief and Works Agency (UNRWA) in Vienna, Austria and Gaza. Then, in 2004, he was appointed Deputy Prosecutor of the International Criminal Tribunal for the former Yugoslavia (ICTY) by UN Secretary-General Kofi Annan. Before becoming the Deputy Prosecutor of ICTY, he had served as deputy registrar and chef de cabinet to President Gabrielle Kirk McDonald in the same institution. In July 2009, he was appointed by UN Secretary General Ban Ki-moon as a registrar for the special tribunal prosecuting the assassination of former Lebanese prime minister Rafik Hariri. Tolbert worked with the Special Tribunal for Lebanon from August 2009 to March 2010. 

He has served as the Executive Director of the American Bar Association's Central European and Eurasian Law Initiative (ABA CEELI), an institution that manages rule of law development programs throughout Eastern Europe and the former Soviet Union. 

Tolbert obtained his B.A. magna cum laude from Furman University, his J.D. from the University of North Carolina and his LL. M. with distinction from the University of Nottingham. He has published widely regarding international criminal justice, the ICTY and the International Criminal Court (ICC) and has represented the ICTY in the discussions leading up to the creation of the ICC. He has also taught international law and human rights at the post-graduate level in the United Kingdom and practiced law for many years in the United States.

References

External links
David Tolbert speaks about the International Court of Justice—video published by the Politiek Cafe Foundation, The Netherlands

Year of birth missing (living people)
Living people
American officials of the United Nations
International Criminal Tribunal for the former Yugoslavia prosecutors
American lawyers
Furman University alumni
University of North Carolina alumni
Alumni of the University of Nottingham